Pinball Dreams is a pinball simulation video game developed by  Digital Illusions and originally released for the Amiga in 1992. It spawned several sequels, including Pinball Fantasies and Pinball Illusions. The MS-DOS port was digitally released by Rebellion Developments along with its sequel and  Pinball Mania on February 22, 2011 on GOG.com with support for Microsoft Windows. It received an OS X build on April 23, 2013; and a Linux build on August 19, 2014.

Gameplay
The game's four tables each had a theme, as do most real-life pinball & Panchinko machines. The version of Pinball Dreams bundled with the Amiga 1200 had a bug which rendered most of Beat Box's advanced features non-functional.

"Ignition", themed around a rocket launch, planets, and space exploration. The Expert Software's Pinball 2000 port of the game renamed this table "Rocket".
"Steel Wheel", themed around steam trains and the Old West.
"Beat Box", themed around the music industry, charts, bands and tours.
"Nightmare", themed around a graveyard, ghosts, demons, nightmares and generally evil things. Unlike the other tables in the game, the name of the table in the menu did not reflect the name displayed on the table itself—"Graveyard". Some ports of the game (notably the GameTek port to the Game Boy) name this table "Graveyard" in the menu as well.

Development
The ball moves according to reasonably realistic physics, and the game was restricted to using table elements which would also be possible to build in reality. Sound and music were realized with Module files, with this technology several music tracks could be included on the limited space of floppy disks.

Ports:
Atari Falcon
Commodore 64: A preview was released at the Breakpoint demo party in April 2006.
Game Boy
Game Gear
Game Boy Advance: Under the title Pinball Challenge Deluxe, with tables added from Pinball Fantasies.
GP32: Released in October 2002.
Super Nintendo Entertainment System: A mostly accurate conversion, including all four tables and near-perfect sound. However, the red "blood" under the top bumper in the "Nightmare" table has been changed to blue and the crosses were removed.
PC: A conversion for DOS based systems by Spidersoft.
iPhone/iPod Touch: Released in January 2009 by Cowboy Rodeo as Pinball Dreaming: Pinball Dreams.
PlayStation Network: Released in November 2009 by Cowboy Rodeo.
iPhone/iPod Touch/iPad: Released in July 2011 by Cowboy Rodeo as Pinball Dreams HD.
OS X: Released in August 2011 by Cowboy Rodeo as Pinball Dreams HD.
Amstrad CPC: Released in October 2019 by BG GAMES.

Reception

Pinball Dreams was a commercial success, selling more than 650,000 copies in its debut year.

Pinball Dreams was overall received positive by press reviews. Electronic Gaming Monthly gave the Game Gear version a 5.8 out of 10, commenting that "Pinball never really worked well on portable systems and Pinball Dreams is no exception. The boards are huge, but the game is a little slow."

In 1993 Computer Gaming World criticized the PC version of Pinball Dreams as having "the worst physical model" of four reviewed games, and disliked the "jerk[y]" scrolling. The magazine said in June 1994 that Pinball 2000 "is an average title at a better than average price". In 1996 the magazine ranked Pinball Dreams as the 119th best game of all time, stating, "Smooth scrolling and great ball physics made this Amiga game a wizard's choice." In 2011, Wirtualna Polska ranked it as the fourth best Amiga game.

Sequels and spin-offs

Pinball Dreams 2
An alternate PC-only sequel, Pinball Dreams 2, was released in 1995 by 21st Century Entertainment (like Pinball Dreams) but was developed by Spidersoft.

It includes four tables:
"Neptune", themed to underwater exploration.
"Safari", themed to an African safari.
"Revenge of the Robot Warriors", themed to a battle against robots.
"Stall Turn", themed to aerobatics.

Composer Andrew Barnabas did not have access to the game while writing its music, and was instead given only a list of song titles and a copy of the original Pinball Dreams. He complained that "I couldn't even see what the game looked like. It was like composing in the dark."

Pinball Mania
Pinball Mania is a 1995 DOS game based on Pinball Dreams. While "Digital Illusions was not involved in the fourth title in 21st Century's pinball series" it was instead developed by Spidersoft. The game featured 4 tables: Kick Off, Jail Break, Tarantula, and Jackpot. PC Games (Germany) gave the game a 69 out of 100, while High Score gave it 3 out of 5. A Game Boy port was published by GameTek UK Ltd. Consoles Plus gave it 80 out of 100, while Total! (Germany)	gave it 3 out of 6.

Absolute Pinball
Absolute Pinball is a 1996 DOS game based on Pinball Dreams. It was developed by Unique Development Studios AB and published by 21st Century Entertainment Ltd. on Sep 01, 1996. Joystick (French) gave it 80 out of 100, Coming Soon Magazine gave it 76 out of 100, PC Games (Germany) gave it 75 out of 100, PC Player (Denmark) gave it 70 out of 100, PC Player (Germany) gave it 3 Stars, High Score gave it 3 out of 5, PC Joker gave it 55 out of 100, and Power Play gave it 54 out of 100.

Pinball Builder
Pinball Builder: A Construction Kit for Windows is a Windows 3.x 1996 game developed by Spidersoft and published by 21st Century Entertainment. Based on the Pinball Dreams/Fantasies series, the game is a "pinball construction kit for Windows". Mobygames explains "This package was included in Encore's "Pinball Madness 2" collection in 1999." PC Player (Denmark) gave it 70 out of 100, Gamezilla gave it 58 out of 100, PC Games (Germany) gave it 53 out of 100, PC Player (Germany) gave it 2 Stars, Power Play gave it 34 out of 100, and High Score gave it 1 out of 5

Total Pinball 3D
Total Pinball 3D is a DOS game released in 1996 by 21st Century Entertainment and developed by Spidersoft.

A Next Generation reviewer criticized that the view of the table in 2D mode is too small due to it being restricted to one side of the screen, and concluded, "There is a lot of variety in play style, difficulty, and theme, and the graphics are sharp, but compared to the high level of detail and originality in recent titles, the tables here look bland. ... much better games like Hyper 3-D Pinball and Pro Pinball: The Web now come to mind." He scored it two out of five stars. Coming Soon Magazine gave it 81 out of 100, PC Games (Germany) gave it 68 out of 100, GameSpot gave it 5.8 out of 10, Power Play gave it 42 out of 100, and PC Player (Germany) gave it 1 Stars.

References

External links

1992 video games
Amiga games
Digital Illusions CE games
DOS games
Game Boy Advance games
Games commercially released with DOSBox
Game Gear games
IOS games
IPod games
MacOS games
Pinball video games
PlayStation Network games
Super Nintendo Entertainment System games
Video games developed in Sweden
Video games scored by David Lowe
Video games scored by Olof Gustafsson
GameTek games
Multiplayer and single-player video games